Citta (Pali and Sanskrit: चित्त; pronounced chitta; IAST: citta) is one of three overlapping terms used in the nikaya to refer to the mind, the others being manas and viññāṇa. Each is sometimes used in the generic and non-technical sense of "mind" in general, and the three are sometimes used in sequence to refer to one's mental processes as a whole. Their primary uses are, however, distinct.

Usage
The Pali–English Dictionary translates citta as heart or heart-mind, emphasizing it as more the emotive side of mind, as opposed to manas as the intellect in the sense of what grasps mental objects (dhamma). Citta is the object of meditation in the third part of Satipatthana, also called Four Foundations of Mindfulness.

Citta primarily represents one's mindset, or state of mind. It is the term used to refer to the quality of mental processes as a whole. Citta is neither an entity nor a process; this likely accounts for its not being classified as a skandha, nor mentioned in the paticcasamuppada formula. In Indian Psychology, chitta is the seat & organ of thought (cetasā cinteti; cp. Gr. φρήν, although on the whole it corresponds more to the Homeric χυμός).

The complex causal nexus of volitions (or intentions) which one experiences continuously conditions one's thoughts, speech, and actions. One's state of mind at any given time reflects that complex; thus, the causal origin of actions, speech, and thoughts is sometimes associated with the state of mind in a manner of speaking. This does not mean that it is that causal nexus; it is better understood as an abstract reflection. One's mindset can be out of tune with one's desires or aspirations. In that it reflects the volitions, the citta is said to go off with a will of its own if not properly controlled. It may lead a person astray or, if properly controlled, directed and integrated, ennobling one. One may "make citta turn according to" his wishes most effectively by developing skill in meditative concentration which brings mental calm and clarity. An individual undergoes many different states of mind; M.II.27 asks: "Which citta? for citta is manifold, various, and diverse." Generally speaking, a person will operate with a collection of changing mindsets, and some will occur regularly. While these mindsets determine the personality, they are not in control of themselves, but fluctuate and alternate. There is thus the need for the meditative integration of personality to provide a greater, more wholesome consistency.

Regarding volitions, there is a similarity between viññāna and chitta; they are both associated with the qualitative condition of a human being. Viññāna provides awareness and continuity by which one knows one's moral condition, and citta is an abstraction representing that condition. Citta is therefore closely related to volitions; this connection is also etymological, as chitta comes from the same verbal root in Pali as the active terms meaning "to will". chitta also reflects one's cognitive condition/progress.

Citta as a mindset can become "contracted" (i.e. unworkable), "distracted", "grown great", "composed", or the opposite of such qualities (M.I.59). It can be dominated by a certain emotion, so as to be "terrified", "astonished", or "tranquil." It can be "taken hold of" by pleasant or unpleasant impressions (M.I.423). A host of negative emotionally charged states can pertain to it, or it may be free of such states, so it is vital to develop or purify it: "For a long time this chitta has been defiled by attachment, hatred, and delusion. By defilement of chitta, beings are defiled; by purity of chitta, beings are purified" (S.III.152).

Attaining a purified chitta corresponds to the attaining of liberating insight. This indicates that a liberated state of mind reflects no ignorance or defilements. As these represent bondage, their absence is described in terms of freedom.

See also
 Chit (consciousness)
 Cetasika
 Luminous mind
 Vijnana
 Yogachara

References

Further reading

External links
 Thich Nhat Tu, Nature Of chitta, Mano And Viññāṅa

Buddhist philosophical concepts